Spinal muscular atrophy with lower extremity predominance 2B (SMALED2B) is a rare neuromuscular disorder characterised by generalised muscle weakness.

Indications
Decreased foetal movement is apparent already before birth. The child is born with a generalised muscle weakness (hypotonia) and contractures resembling arthrogryposis multiplex congenita, respiratory insufficiency, and sometimes facial deformations.  The disorder is frequently fatal in early childhood.

Cause
The disease is caused by a mutation in the BICD2 gene and is passed on in an autosomal dominant manner.  There is no known cure to SMALED2B.

See also 
 Spinal muscular atrophies
 Spinal muscular atrophy with lower extremity predominance 1
 Spinal muscular atrophy with lower extremity predominance 2A

References 

Autosomal dominant disorders
Neurogenetic disorders
Neuromuscular disorders
Rare diseases
Systemic atrophies primarily affecting the central nervous system